The white-headed blind snake (Indotyphlops albiceps) is a species of snake in the Typhlopidae family.

References

Indotyphlops
Reptiles described in 1898